The 2007 Dallas Desperados season was the 6th season for the franchise. They made the playoffs again after finishing 2006 with a 13–3 record.  They had a 15–1 record and qualified for home-field advantage throughout the National Conference playoffs.

Schedule

Playoff schedule

Coaching
Will McClay started his fourth season as head coach of the Desperados.

Stats

Offense

Quarterback

Running backs

Wide receivers

Touchdowns

Defense

Special teams

Kick return

Kicking

Playoff Stats

Offense

Quarterback

Running backs

Wide receivers

Special teams

Kick return

Kicking

Regular season

Week 1: at New York Dragons

Scoring Summary:

1st Quarter:

2nd Quarter:

3rd Quarter:

4th Quarter:

Week 2: vs Tampa Bay Storm

Scoring Summary:

1st Quarter:

2nd Quarter:

3rd Quarter:

4th Quarter:

Week 3: at Kansas City Brigade

Scoring Summary:

1st Quarter:

2nd Quarter:

3rd Quarter:

4th Quarter:

Week 4: at Orlando Predators

Scoring Summary:

1st Quarter:

2nd Quarter:

3rd Quarter:

4th Quarter:

Week 5: vs Austin Wranglers

Scoring Summary:

1st Quarter:

2nd Quarter:

3rd Quarter:

4th Quarter:

Week 6: vs Columbus Destroyers

Scoring Summary:

1st Quarter:

2nd Quarter:

3rd Quarter:

4th Quarter:

Week 7: vs Philadelphia Soul

Scoring Summary:

1st Quarter:

2nd Quarter:

3rd Quarter:

4th Quarter:

Week 8: at Georgia Force

Scoring Summary:

1st Quarter:

2nd Quarter:

3rd Quarter:

4th Quarter:

Week 9: vs Nashville Kats

Scoring Summary:

1st Quarter:

2nd Quarter:

3rd Quarter:

4th Quarter:

Week 10: at Utah Blaze

Scoring Summary:

1st Quarter:

2nd Quarter:

3rd Quarter:

4th Quarter:

Week 11: vs Chicago Rush

Scoring Summary:

1st Quarter:

2nd Quarter:

3rd Quarter:

4th Quarter:

Week 13: at Columbus Destroyers

Scoring Summary:

1st Quarter:

2nd Quarter:

3rd Quarter:

4th Quarter:

Week 14: at Philadelphia Soul

Scoring Summary:

1st Quarter:

2nd Quarter:

3rd Quarter:

4th Quarter:

Week 15: vs New Orleans VooDoo

Scoring Summary:

1st Quarter:

2nd Quarter:

3rd Quarter:

4th Quarter:

Week 16: vs New York Dragons

Scoring Summary:

1st Quarter:

2nd Quarter:

3rd Quarter:

4th Quarter:

Week 17: at Colorado Crush

Scoring Summary:

1st Quarter:

2nd Quarter:

3rd Quarter:

4th Quarter:

Playoffs

Week 2: vs Columbus Destroyers

at the American Airlines Center in Dallas, Texas

The Destroyers blew a 30-point lead and lost to the Desperados earlier this season 53–51 and they lost the 2nd game in Columbus 56–47. This time, it looked as if Dallas, after a shaky start, would continue their dominance over the Destroyers. Leading 38–28 at the half, the tide turned on back-to-back kickoffs by Columbus kicker Peter Martinez. Dallas, who had deferred, got the opening kickoff. However, the ball bounced off the goalpost and into the hands of Columbus' Josh Bush. On the very next kickoff, a nearly identical play occurred when the ball again bounced off the goalpost and Columbus recovered at the 4-yard line. On the next play, Damien Groce ran the ball in to give Columbus a sudden 42–38 lead 58 seconds into the second  half. After a Clint Dolezel interception set up a field goal for Columbus, Jason Shelley put the game away with a 28-yard reception with 12:55 left in the game to give Columbus a 2-touchdown lead that they held onto to pull off the upset against the Desperados.

2007 Arena Football League season
Dallas Desperados seasons
Dallas